is a Japanese journalist known for his books and articles on modern China.

Biography
Morohoshi was born in Kushiro city and spent young days in Sapporo city in Hokkaido prefecture. He studied Chinese modern literature at Tokyo University of Foreign Studies and his graduation thesis is "Liu Binyan and freedom of speech in China". He worked at the Hokkaido Shimbun Press for a while, and went on to a master's course of Tokyo University of Foreign Studies to major in historical and cultural studies of modern China. He went abroad to Wuhan University (from September 1987 to February1989) and Peking University (from Sept.1991 to Jul.1992) to study Chinese modern literature. When he was a university student, he wrote a feature story about San'ya (a slum in Tokyo) in the newspaper of the Tokyo University of Foreign Studies.

His points of view on contemporary China
He basically appreciates Chinese economic reform and regards Maoism, especially the Chinese Cultural Revolution, as fascism. He gave severe criticism to a Japanese journalist Katsuichi Honda, whom he charges with concealing Honda's standpoint as a Maoist even though Honda admired the Chinese Cultural Revolution. Although many China watchers in Japan expect Chinese economy (or China itself) will start to collapse around 2007, yet he consistently denies such opinions. He early wanted to report Uyghur genocide in Xinjiang, but Katsuichi Honda――the chief editor of “Weekly Friday”――refused to carry the article.

Works
all written by Japanses
『沈黙の国の記者――劉賓雁と中国共産党』A Journalist in the Silent Country:Liu Binyan and the Communist Party of China (1992.12)
『ルポ中国』China Now (1996.7)
『中国革命の夢が潰えたとき――毛沢東に裏切られた人々』Disillusion to the Communist Revolution of China:People Betrayed by Mao Zedong (2000.1)
『チベットの現在』Tibet Now (2014.1)

Translation
all written by Japanses
『劉賓雁ルポ作品集』The Selected Works of Liu Binyan (2004.7)

See also
Liu Binyan
Tibetan sovereignty debate
Human rights in China
List of Chinese dissidents
Anti-Rightist Movement
Cultural Revolution

References

External links
刘宾雁网坛(Chinese)

Living people
Japanese women journalists
1965 births